The Worshipful Company of Blacksmiths is one of the livery companies of the City of London. The organisation was first mentioned in a court record in 1299. A Royal Charter officially granting it the status of Company was granted in 1571. The Company originally had the right to set regulations and standards for blacksmiths in the City of London. However, the right eroded over time. By the end of the eighteenth century, little remained of the Company's former powers and so the Company did not the renew the lease on its hall at expiration in 1785.

Background
Trustees continued to administer the funds of the Society. From 1828 there was a renewed energy on the social aspects of the company. After 1890 there was a renewed connection with the craft of Blacksmithing, and by 1934 this was on a basis covering all of the United Kingdom rather than just the City of London. The members (both men and women) of the Livery now include many practising blacksmiths.

Nowadays the Court of The Worshipful Company of Blacksmiths, on the advice of the Craft Committee, awards a range of Certificates, Diplomas and Medals. These recognise various degrees of ability and quality of workmanship achievable by training and experience of Blacksmiths working as individuals and when working as a team. The awards range from a Certificate of Competence and a Journeyman's Certificate for apprentices starting out on their careers to a Gold Medal for consistent work of very high quality in prestigious commissions given to blacksmiths who have had long experience in the craft.

The Company provides judges and prizes at County Shows, and maintains a charitable trust which makes donations, principally to support trainee blacksmiths in the UK.
	
The Blacksmiths' Company ranks fortieth in the order of precedence of Livery Companies. Its motto is By Hammer and Hand All Arts Do Stand.

References

External links
 

Blacksmiths